Barry McGovern (born 1948) is an Irish stage, film and television actor. He was educated at Castleknock College, Dublin.

Background
McGovern is a former member of the RTÉ Players and the Abbey Theatre Company. He has worked in theatre, film, radio and television, as well as written music for many shows, and co-written two musicals and directed plays and operas. He is known internationally for his award-winning one-man Beckett shows I'll Go On and Watt which the Gate Theatre presented at the 1985 and 2010 Dublin Theatre Festival respectively.  McGovern revived "I'll Go On" for a run at the Kirk Douglas Theatre in Culver City for L.A.'s Center Theatre Group in 2014.

Filmography

Reviews
(on his one man show "I'll Go On")
"McGovern illuminates the accessibility of the novels, their Irishness and their brilliant, bitter humour...brilliant" - The New York Times
"Barry McGovern's dazzling one-man performance…makes for wicked, compulsive fun" - The Irish Times
"An outright triumph…arrestingly funny" - Time
"90 minutes of laughter, bitterness, compassion and verbal music to leave you rapt" - New York
"Superb one-man show…. Without doubt one of the best interpreters of Samuel Beckett's work, McGovern's performance is masterful" - Sunday Business
“Barry McGovern’s astounding performance was not only the best of the festival, but also among the best I’ve ever seen… genius, no other word for it." - Sun Herald

Awards and nominations
Ovation Awards
2012: Nominated for Lead Actor in a Play for the role of Vladimir in the Center Theatre Group production of "Waiting For Godot"

References

External links

 

1948 births
Irish male film actors
Irish male stage actors
Irish male television actors
Living people
Date of birth missing (living people)
People educated at Castleknock College